Sanka Danushka is a Sri Lankan professional footballer who plays as a defender for Sri Lanka Army in the Sri Lanka Football Premier League.

References

Sri Lankan footballers
1984 births
Living people
Sri Lanka international footballers
Sri Lanka Army SC (football) players
Association football defenders
Sri Lanka Football Premier League players